

Thornfalcon is a village and civil parish in Somerset, England, situated  east of Taunton in the Somerset West and Taunton district.  The village has a population of 119. The parish includes the hamlet of Ash. The name comes from Thorn, and the personal name Fagun (now Falcon) which was the Norman surname of Sir Gilbert of Thorn, whose family were lords of the manor until the 14th century.

The parish of Thorne Falcon  was part of the North Curry Hundred. The manor was bought from the Burridges of Lyme Regis by Nathaniel Butler Batten of Yeovil whose descendants, known as Chisholm-Batten from 1859 lived at Court House.

The village is in the non-metropolitan district of Somerset West and Taunton, which was established on 1 April 2019. It was previously in the district of Taunton Deane, which was formed on 1 April 1974 under the Local Government Act 1972, and part of Taunton Rural District before that. The district council is responsible for local planning and building control, local roads, council housing, environmental health, markets and fairs, refuse collection and recycling, cemeteries and crematoria, leisure services, parks, and tourism.

The parish council has responsibility for local issues, including setting an annual precept (local rate) to cover the council’s operating costs and producing annual accounts for public scrutiny. The parish council evaluates local planning applications and works with the local police, district council officers, and neighbourhood watch groups on matters of crime, security, and traffic. The parish council's role includes initiating projects for maintenance and repair of parish facilities, as well as consulting with the district council on the maintenance, repair, and improvement of highways, drainage, footpaths, public transport, and street cleaning. Conservation matters (including trees and listed buildings) and environmental issues are the council's responsibility.

Somerset County Council runs the largest and most expensive local services, such as education, social services, libraries, main roads, public transport, policing and  fire services, trading standards, waste disposal and strategic planning.

It is part of the Taunton Deane county constituency represented in the House of Commons of the Parliament of the United Kingdom. It elects one Member of Parliament (MP) by the first past the post system of election.

There was a station on the Chard Branch Line that closed in 1962. The road bridge over the line is designated as a Grade II listed building. The village is near the Great Western Railway and the Chard Canal — the road bridge over the canal is also listed.

The Battlements was built by the Chisholm-Batten family in the early-mid 19th century. It was originally a school building, but is now a private house, whilst the Court House is older, dating from the late 15th century.

The parish Church of the Holy Cross dates from the 14th century and was restored in 1882 by Benjamin Ferrey. It is designated as a grade I listed building.

References

External links

Villages in Taunton Deane
Civil parishes in Somerset